Cloverdale is an unincorporated community in Osceola County, Iowa, United States. It is located 5 miles southeast of the county seat Sibley, and 10 miles from the Iowa-Minnesota border.

History
Cloverdale's population was 50 in 1925.

References

Unincorporated communities in Osceola County, Iowa
Unincorporated communities in Iowa